The Stratoni mine is an underground, silver-lead-zinc mine located in the Chalkidiki Peninsula in northern Greece.  It uses a multi-stage flotation process to extract a lead-silver concentrate and a zinc concentrate.

The mine is located 3 kilometers from Stratoni, Greece, where the loading and port is located, and 100 kilometers from Thessaloniki.

References 

Silver mines in Greece
Zinc mines in Greece